"The Ones That Didn't Make It Back Home" is a song recorded by American country music singer Justin Moore. It is the first single to his fifth studio album Late Nights and Longnecks. Moore wrote the song with Paul DiGiovanni, Chase McGill, and Jeremy Stover, who also co- produced it with Scott Borchetta.

Content
Moore wrote the song with his producer, Jeremy Stover, along with Boys Like Girls member Paul DiGiovanni and songwriter Chase McGill. The song, which according to Rolling Stone features "a soaring chorus and weeping guitar work", pays tribute to soldiers who did not return from duty. Angela Stefano of the blog The Boot said of the song that  "Listeners who are expecting a somber melody won't get that, though the lyrics are still devastating enough to draw a tear or two." and "The lyrics are just specific enough to paint a vivid picture, yet they're general enough to evoke the stories of any number of fallen military members." Moore said that the song's message was inspired by his paternal grandparents.

Commercial performance

The song has sold 61,000 copies in the United States as of September 2019.

Music video
The video was directed by Cody Villalobos, who is Moore's social media manager and a former emergency medical technician. Villalobos said that he was inspired to include not only soldiers, but also policemen and firefighters in the video due to it being released soon after the Stoneman Douglas High School shooting.

Charts

Weekly charts

Year-end charts

Certifications

References

2018 songs
2018 singles
Justin Moore songs
Big Machine Records singles
Songs written by Justin Moore
Songs written by Jeremy Stover
Songs written by Chase McGill
Songs about death
Song recordings produced by Jeremy Stover